Under the Pavement Lies the Strand is a 1975 West German black and white drama film directed by Helma Sanders-Brahms. This low-budget film was her first feature film. Prior to making the film, Sanders-Brahms had little to no distinct contact with the women's rights movement.

Plot
The film deals with the aftermath of the 1968 student rebellions in Germany as experienced by two fervent participants. Though the country experienced sweeping reforms in the years following, two radicals-turned-successful Berlin stage actors and lovers grapple with their growing insignificance and the demands of adulthood. After a night of intense debate about the past and their future, the couple begins garnering support to fight a new abortion bill. However, their rekindled zeal is complicated by an unexpected pregnancy.

Cast
 Grischa Huber as Grischa
 Heinrich Giskes as Heinrich
 Ursula von Berg as Berlin Woman
 Gesine Strempel as Berlin Woman
 Traute Klier-Siebert as Berlin Woman
 Barbara Finkenstädt as Berlin Woman
 Heinz Hoenig
 Günter Lampe

Release
The film was released on DVD by Facets Multi-Media in 2008.

Reception
Wendy Ellen Everett and Axel Goodbody, editors of Revisiting Space: Space and Place in European Cinema, said that it "became a cult film in the German feminist movement." The film's main actress and actor won the Deutscher Filmpreis (Filmband in Gold) in 1975 and it was called one of Sanders-Brahms' best films by Salon critic Andrew O'Hehir. PopMatters critic Stuart Henderson referred to the film as a "revelation" and "fascinating and important film." The Philadelphia City Paper stated that the film was a "cult film for the feminist movement", noting that it is screened in repertory cinemas, calling it a "film still of vital interest."

References

External links

Under the Pavement Lies the Strand at the TCM Movie Database
Unter dem Pflaster ist der Strand at Film Portal 

1975 drama films
1975 films
German black-and-white films
Films about abortion
Films about theatre
Films directed by Helma Sanders-Brahms
Films set in 1974
Films set in Berlin
Films shot in Germany
German drama films
1970s German-language films
West German films
1975 directorial debut films
1970s German films